The 2014–15 Grand Rapids Griffins season was the franchise's 14th season in the American Hockey League.

Regular season
The Griffins set a franchise record 19-game point streak, beginning on February 4, and ending on March 21. The streak was the longest in the AHL since the Norfolk Admirals concluded the 2011–12 season with 28 consecutive wins.

Standings

Divisional standings

 indicates team has clinched division and a playoff spot
 indicates team has clinched a playoff spot
 indicates team has been eliminated from playoff contention

Conference standings

Schedule and results

Pre-season

Regular season

Playoffs

Player statistics

Skaters
Note: GP = Games played; G = Goals; A = Assists; Pts = Points; +/− = Plus/minus; PIM = Penalty minutes

Goaltenders
Note: GP = Games played; TOI = Time on ice; W = Wins; L = Losses; GA = Goals against; GAA = Goals against average; SV = Saves; SA = Shots against; SV% = Save percentage; SO = Shutouts; G = Goals; A = Assists; PIM = Penalty minutes

†Denotes player spent time with another team before joining team. Stats reflect time with the team only.
‡Left the team mid-season
*Rookie

Final roster
Updated May 29, 2015

|}

References

External links
Official Website of the AHL

Grand
Grand
Grand Rapids Griffins